Millingport is an unincorporated community and census-designated place in Stanly County, North Carolina, United States. Its population was 599 as of the 2010 census. North Carolina Highway 73 passes through the community.

Geography

Demographics

References

Unincorporated communities in Stanly County, North Carolina
Unincorporated communities in North Carolina
Census-designated places in Stanly County, North Carolina
Census-designated places in North Carolina